Miguel Ángel Chávez Velasco (born August 18, 1988), better known by his ring name Ángel de Oro (Spanish for "Angel of Gold" or "Golden Angel"), is a Mexican professional wrestler who works for the Mexican wrestling promotion Consejo Mundial de Lucha Libre (CMLL). He is currently a double champion in CMLL, as he is the Mexican National Light Heavyweight Champion and the World Tag Team Champion, both in his first reign.

In 2018, he was defeated in a Luchas de Apuestas (mascara contra mascara; "mask vs. mask") match by El Cuatrero, and was forced to unmask and be identified. He is a second-generation luchador, the son of Apolo Chávez and the brother of the luchador Niebla Roja, who also works for CMLL. From 2008 to 2011, Ángel de Oro was part of a group called Los Ángeles Celestiales ("The Celestial Angels") alongside his brother (then billed as Ángel de Plata) and Ángel Azteca Jr., but after his brother changed his ring persona, that group has been phased out. After many years of portraying a tecnico ("Good guy") wrestling character, Ángel de Oro and his brother turned rudo and aligned themselves with El Terrible, eventually forming Los Nuevos Ingobernables.

His accolades in CMLL include being a former CMLL World Middleweight Champion, CMLL World Light Heavyweight Champion, Mexican National Trios Champion, as well as the winner of the 2011 Forjando un Ídolo tournament, the 2020 Leyenda de Azul tournament and the 2021 La Copa Junior VIP tournament. He is also a three time winner of the CMLL Reyes del Aire tournament.

Professional wrestling career
Chávez and his older brother, Niebla Roja, are the sons of professional wrestler Apolo Chávez and grew up idolizing their father. Ángel de Oro was trained for his professional wrestling debut by Dibólico and Corsario Rojo and would receive further training from Gran Cochisse, El Satánico and Franco Columbo later in his career. Early on Ángel de Plata worked mainly for independent promotions around the Gómez Palacio, Durango area, often while feuding with his brother who at the time wrestled as Guerrero Inca ("Incan Warrior"). It was the feud between the two brothers that got Ángel de Oro noticed by Consejo Mundial de Lucha Libre (CMLL) talent scouts and landed him a contract with CMLL. His brother changed his ring character to Ángel de Plata (Silver Angel) to complement his younger brother's ring character and together they began training at CMLL's wrestling school in Guadalajara, Jalisco.

Consejo Mundial de Lucha Libre (2008present)

The duo made their CMLL debut on July 4, 2008, wrestling, as a team dubbed Los Angeles Celestiales ("The Celestial Angels") The duo was made into a trio when they were joined by Ángel Azteca Jr. who used a similar "Angel inspired" ring character. Los Angeles Celestiales worked low card matches throughout 2008 and into 2009, gaining valuable ring experience along the way. On April 7, 2009, Ángel de Oro participated in a 10-man Torneo cibernetico elimination match for the vacant CMLL World Super Lightweight Championship. The other participants included Ángel Azteca Jr., Rey Cometa, Pegasso, Tiger Kid, Pólvora, Inquisidor, Súper Comando, Angel de Plata and eventual winner Máscara Dorada. In late 2009 Ángel de Oro participated in the 2009 Gran Alternativa tournament, a tournament where an experienced wrestler teams up with a newcomer. Ángel de Oro teamed up with Místico, CMLL's most popular wrestler at the time, to form a team that was considered the favorite for the tournament. They defeated Atlantis and Camorra and Mr. Niebla and Tiger Kid en route to the final, where they were defeated by the Japanese duo of Naito and Okumura in an upset. On October 18, 2009, Angel de Oro was one of 12 wrestlers who put his mask on the line in a 12-man Luchas de Apuestas cage match. He was the tenth and last person to escape the cage keeping his mask safe while Tigre Blanco was forced to unmask after the loss to Pólvora.

Los Ángeles Celestiales participated in a 2009 tournament to crown new Mexican National Trios Champion. The team lost in the first round to Los Cancerberos del Infierno (Virus, Pólvora and Euforia). Following the tournament loss Los Ángeles Celestiales and Los Cancerberos del Infierno developed a rivalry between the two groups, facing off on various CMLL shows, including CMLL's main weekly show on Friday nights Super Viernes. In early 2010 Ángel de Oro was voted "Newcomer of the year", both for CMLL and by Súper Luchas Magazine. As a sign of his success so far Ángel de Oro participated in his first ever major CMLL event as he teamed up with Fuego and Stuka Jr., wrestling and losing to Poder Mexica (Sangre Azteca, Dragón Rojo Jr. and Misterioso II) in the opening match of the 2010 Homenaje a Dos Leyendas on March 19, 2010. Ángel de Oro was one of 12 men who put their mask on the line as part of a 12-man steel cage match in the main event of the 2010 Infierno en el Ring. During the match, his brother Ángel de Plata tricked him in order to escape the cage. Later on rival Puma King feigned an alliance with Ángel de Oro only to jump him from behind and then escape the cage as well. The match came down to Ángel de Oro, Doctor X, and Fabián el Gitano, only to see Ángel de Oro accidentally hit Fabián el Gitano so that Doctor X could escape the cage, leaving Ángel de Oro and Fabián to fight for their masks. Ángel de Oro won his first Lucha de Apueta (bet match) by pinning Fabián, forcing him to unmask and reveal his name as per lucha libre traditions. On August 15, 2010, Ángel de Oro participated in a "Mexico City vs. Guadalajara" torneo cibernetico, an elimination match between young wrestlers trained at CMLL's wrestling school in Mexico and young wrestlers trained at CMLL's facility in Guadalajara where he represented the Mexico City city. The match, that also included his brother Ángel de Plata, as well as Ángel Azteca Jr., Delta and Fuego on the Mexico City team and Ángel del Mal, Metal Blanco, El Gallo, Leo and Palacio Negro on the Guadalajara team. It came down to Ángel de Oro and Metal Blanco as the last two wrestlers, with Ángel de Oro taking the victory for Mexico City after Guadalajara trained Ángel del Mal (not related to Ángel de Oro and Ángel de Plata) betrayed his "home town" by costing Metal Blanco the match. On September 3, 2010 Ángel de Oro teamed up with Delta and Stuka Jr. to defeat Los Guerreros Tuareg (Arkangel de la Muerte and Skándalo) and Pólvora on the undercard of the CMLL 77th Anniversary Show. Up until the end of 2010 CMLL had not really promoted the fact that Ángel de Oro and Ángel de Plata were second-generation wrestlers, but they acknowledge this when both competed in the 2010 La Copa Junior tournament on December 25. In the tournament, Ángel de Oro lost to Negro Casas in the first round. On January 1, 2011, Ángel de Oro defeated fourteen other men in a torneo cibernetico to win the 2011 Reyes del Aire. On January 9 Ángel de Oro, Diamante, and Rush defeated Delta, Metro, and Stuka Jr. to win the Mexican National Trios Championship.

In early 2011 Ángel de Oro was teamed up with the rudo wrestler Último Guerrero for the 2011 version of the Torneo Nacional de Parejas Increibles ("National Incredible Pairs Tournament"), a lucha libre concept where a rudo and a tecnico wrestler are forced to team up and try to get along for a tournament. Often time the pairs are created to further ongoing storylines but there had been very little direct interaction between Ángel de Oro and Último Guerrero prior to the tournament. In the first round the duo defeatedToscano and El Terrible, but lost in the second round to Guerrero's rival Blue Panther and Guerrero's regular teammate Dragón Rojo Jr. On February 28, 2011 Ángel de Oro, Diamante, and Rush successfully defended the Mexican National Trios Championship against Los Cancerberos del Infierno (Euforia, Pólvora and Virus) Over the spring of 2011 Ángel de Oro was one of 16 competitor's in CMLL's first ever Forjando un Ídolo ("Forging an Idol") tournament, designed to showcase some of CMLL's younger, lower ranked wrestlers in order to elevate one or more of them up the ranks. In the first round of the tournament Ángel de Oro defeated Escorpión, Palacio Negro, Rey Cometa to earn 9 points and win his group to qualify for the second round. In the second round he defeated Guerrero Maya Jr. and Fuego to qualify for the finals, where he defeated Pólvora to win the entire tournament. The original plan for the tournament was to have Ángel de Oro take over the mask and ring character of Místico, who had left CMLL to work for WWE instead. For undisclosed reasons Ángel de Oro decided not to become the next Místico, instead that role was given to Dragon Lee months later. He competed in the 2011 Leyenda de Azul ("Blue Legend") tournament but was eliminated third, out of ten, by Rey Bucanero. By virtue of holding the Mexican National Trios Championship Ángel de Oro was one of 16 champions that competed in the 2011 CMLL Universal Championship tournament, but lost to La Sombra in the opening round of the tournament. On September 20, Ángel de Oro, Diamante, and Rush lost the Mexican National Trios Championship to Los Invasores (Olímpico, Psicosis II, and Volador Jr.).

On January 3, 2012 Ángel de Oro challenged Dragón Rojo Jr. for the CMLL World Middleweight Championship, his first singles championship challenge in CMLL, but was pinned by Rojo Jr. two falls to one. On February 4, 2012, he won the annual Reyes del Aire tournament after Mr. Águila and Máscara Dorada eliminated each other through a double pinfall. This made Ángel de Oro the person to ever win back-to-back Reyes del Aire tournaments. For the 2012 Torneo Nacional de Parejas Increibles tournament Ángel de Oro teamed up with Psicosis, playing off their past trios championship tension to create an Increibles team for the tournament. In the opening round they defeated El Felino and Rey Bucanero, but lost to eventual tournament winners Rush and El Terrible in the quarter-finals. On April 29, 2012 Ángel de Oro received a shot at the NWA World Historic Welterweight Championship, but was defeated by champion Negro Casas in three falls. He received a second match for the NWA World Historic Welterweight Championship on September 2 but was once again unable to defeat Negro Casas. During the 2012 La Copa Junior tournament he eliminated Tiger, but was in turn eliminated by his storyline rival Negro Casas as the seventh wrestler eliminated in the match. The La Copa Junior elimination was used as the storyline to build to a third NWA World History Welterweight Championship match between Ángel de Oro and Negro Casas on December 11, but once again the veteran Casas successfully defended the championship. In March 2013 Ángel de Oro was paired up with rudo wrestler Ephesto for the 2013 Torneo Nacional de Parejas Increibles tournament. While the two managed to work together they still lost their first round match to the team of Diamante Azul and Euforia. Ángel de Oro's third Reyes del Aire tournament win hopes were dashed when Rey Escorpión eliminated him early on in the match. On April 2, 2013, the makeshift team of Ángel de Oro, Shocker and Valiente joined up to challenge Los Invasores (Kraneo, Mr. Águila and Psicosis) for the Mexican National Trios Championship, but the team was unable to defeat Los Invasores. On September 3, 2013 Ángel de Oro challenged Pólvora for Pólvora's CMLL World Welterweight Championship, but was unable to defeat him.

In December 2013 Ángel de Oro suffered a severe knee injury during a match where he teamed up with Esfinge and Shocker, defeating Euforia, Exterminador and Tiger. The injury required him to have surgery and spend several months out of the ring rehabilitating his knee. He made his return to the ring on June 2, 2015, teaming with Blue Panther and Titán, only to lose to Los Invasores (Kraneo, Morphosis and Ripper. Two months after his return he competed in the 2014 Reyes del Aire tournament in Puebla but was the fourth man eliminated, once again defeated by Ripper who also pinned him in his return match. On October 3 CMLL held a higher profile version of La Copa Junior called La Copa Junior VIP. In the tournament Ángel de Oro lost to La Sombra in the opening match. On October 28, 2014, Ángel de Oro defeated Rey Escorpión to win the CMLL World Light Heavyweight Championship. For the 2015 Torneo Nacional de Parejas Increibles Ángel de Oro was teamed up with Hechicero, who at the time had been asking Ángel de Oro for a title match in the weeks before the tournament. The duo lost to Atlantis and Último Guerrero in the opening round/ On March 1 he had his second successful title defense as he kept the CMLL Light Heavyweight Championship by defeating Gran Guerrero. He also competed in the 2015 CMLL Reyes del Aire tournament but was eliminated midway through the tournament. On June 1, 2015 Ángel de Oro defeated long time rival Ripper to defend the CMLL World Light Heavyweight Championship for a third time. On April 8, 2016 La Máscara defeated Ángel de Oro to end his CMLL World Light Heavyweight Championship after 528 days with the title.

On May 21, 2016 Ángel de Oro was one of ten wrestlers competing in a torneo cibernetico elimination match to determine the first Lucha Libre Elite Middleweight Championship. The match and the championship was won by Caristico as he eliminated Mephisto as the last man in the match. Ángel de Oro was the sixth man eliminated. On March 25, 2017, he defeated Dragón Rojo Jr. to win the CMLL World Middleweight Championship, the victory ended Dragón Rojo Jr.'s over five year long reign as champion. On January 19, 2018 at Fantastica Mania 2018, Ángel de Oro lost the middleweight championship to El Cuatrero as part of an ongoing storyline feud between the two. The two rivals were teamed up for the 2018 Torneo Nacional de Parejas Increíbles tournament, which intentionally team up rivals. The team lost to Atlantis and Mr. Niebla in the first round as they were not able to get along. The Ángel de Oro/El Cuatrero storyline culminated at the 2018 Homenaje a Dos Leyendas ("Homage to two legends") show on March 16, 2018 where the two met in the main event. As a result of his loss to El Cuatrero, Ángel del Oro was forced to remove his mask and reveal his birthname, Miguel Ángel Chávez Velasco, to the public. On May 4 Ángel del Oro participated in his third Gran Alternativa of his career, teaming up with Robin. The team did not make it past the first round as they lost to Yago and Mephisto. On June 1, 2018, Ángel del Oro had a rematch with El Cuatrero for the CMLL World Middleweight Championship, in which El Cuartero retained the championship.

During 2018, Ángel de Oro resumed his partnership with Niebla Roja, as Los Hermanos Chavez. The Universal Championship was the start of a storyline between Los Hermanos Chavez and Los Ingobernables (El Terrible and La Bestia del Ring), as El Terrible cheated to defeat Niebla Roja with the help of La Bestia del Ring. After several matches between the two sides, they all signed a contract for a Luchas de Apuestas match as the main event of CMLL's 2019 Homenaje a Dos Leyendas event. On March 15, 2019 Los Hermanos Chavez defeated Los Ingobernables two falls to one, forcing both El Terrible and La Bestia del Ring to have all their hair shaved off.

In late 2020, despite being booked as tecnicos, Ángel de Oro and Niebla Roja began showing rudo tendencies, which came to a head at Leyenda de Azul. At the event, they worked with El Terrible (the last remaining member of Los Ingobernables), who helped Ángel de Oro win the cibernetico match. Afterwards, they continued to work together under the name Terriblemente Chavez, although Ángel de Oro and his brother were still referred to as tecnicos. On March 24, 2021, they cemented their rudo turn and joined El Terrible, forming Los Nuevos Ingobernables. A few days later, Ángel de Oro won La Copa Junior VIP. On October 5, Ángel de Oro challenged Felino for the Mexican National Light Heavyweight Championship, which would turn out to be successful, defeating Felino on October 12. On January 23, 2022, Ángel de Oro and Niebla Roja won the CMLL World Tag Team Championship.

Japan and the United States (2012–present)
On May 27, 2012, Ángel de Oro entered New Japan Pro-Wrestling's (NJPW) 2012 Best of the Super Juniors tournament. Opening his round-robin tournament with four back-to-back wins (defeating Taichi, Gedo, Jushin Thunder Liger and Pac), Ángel de Oro lost all four of his remaining matches (losing to Prince Devitt, Bushi, Rocky Romero and Kushida) and, as a result, failed to qualify for the semifinals of the tournament. In January 2015, Ángel de Oro returned to Japan to take part in the Fantastica Mania 2015 tour, during which he successfully defended the CMLL World Light Heavyweight Championship against Okumura. In October 2016, Ángel de Oro made his debut for the US based Ring of Honor (ROH) as part of a CMLL-NJPW-ROH working agreement. On October 14 he lost a four-way match to former CMLL wrestler Kamaitachi in a match that also included Nick Jackson and A. C. H. The following night, Ángel de Oro lost to Kamaitachi once more.

Ángel de Oro returned to New Japan Pro-Wrestling on October 21 at Road to Power Struggle event where he took part in 2016 Super Jr. Tag Tournament, teaming up with Titan. However they were eliminated in the first round by Roppongi Vice (Beretta and Rocky Romero).

Championships and accomplishments
Consejo Mundial de Lucha Libre
CMLL World Light Heavyweight Championship (1 time)
CMLL World Middleweight Championship (1 time)
CMLL World Tag Team Championship (1 time, current) – with Niebla Roja
Mexican National Light Heavyweight Championship (1 time, current)
Mexican National Trios Championship (1 time) – with Diamante and Rush
Forjando un Ídolo (2011)
Mexican National Trios Championship #1 Contender's Tournament (2011) – with Diamante and Rush
Leyenda de Azul (2020)
Reyes del Aire (2011, 2012, 2017)
Copa Dinastías (2019) – with Niebla Roja
Copa Junior VIP (2021)
CMLL Newcomer of the Year (2009)
CMLL "Revelation" of the Year (2010)
Pro Wrestling Illustrated
PWI ranked him #159 of the top 500 singles wrestlers in the PWI 500 in 2015
Súper Luchas Magazine
Newcomer of the Year (2009)

Luchas de Apuestas record

Footnotes

References

1988 births
21st-century professional wrestlers
Living people
Masked wrestlers
Mexican male professional wrestlers
Sportspeople from Torreón
Professional wrestlers from Coahuila
Mexican National Trios Champions
CMLL World Light Heavyweight Champions
CMLL World Middleweight Champions
CMLL World Tag Team Champions
Mexican National Light Heavyweight Champions